Brito is a civil parish in the municipality of Guimarães in the Braga District of Portugal. The population in 2021 was 4,775, in an area of 5.90 km².

References

Freguesias of Guimarães